The year 1967 in archaeology involved some significant events.

Explorations
 June 12 - New England Textile Mills Survey commenced by the Historic American Buildings Survey.
 July–September - Provo Brickyard Turbine House, Provo, Utah, recorded by the Historic American Buildings Survey.

Excavations
 The first treasure from the Spanish Armada wreck Girona is recovered off Northern Ireland.
 Excavations at Tel Arad by Yohanan Aharoni end (began 1962).

Publications
 Post-medieval archaeology: the journal of the Society for Post-Medieval Archaeology first published

Finds
 May 20 - Hoard of denarii found at Little Brickhill in Buckinghamshire, England.
 Dholavira site is discovered by Shri Jagatpati Joshi.
 Akrotiri (prehistoric city) is discovered.

Events
 January 6 - The Society for Historical Archaeology is founded in the United States.
 November 3–5 - The theory and practice of industrial archaeology: the Bath Conference on Industrial archaeology.

Births
 February 21 - Neil Oliver, Scottish-born archaeologist and television presenter

Deaths

References

Archaeology
Archaeology
Archaeology by year